The Brevundimonas are a genus of bacteria. They are Gram-negative, non-fermenting, aerobic bacilli. The Brevundimonas species are ubiquitous in the environment but are rarely isolated from clinical samples., although numbers are increasing. Two species of Brevundimonas originally classified under the genus Pseudomonas have been re-classified by Seger et al. as Brevundimonas vesicularis and Brevundimonas diminuta.

Etymology
The name Brevundimonas derives from:
  Latin adjective brevis, short; Latin feminine gender noun unda, a wave; Latin feminine gender noun monas (μονάς), nominally meaning "a unit", but in effect meaning a bacterium; New Latin feminine gender noun Brevundimonas, bacteria with short wavelength flagella.

Members of the genus Brevundimonas can be referred to as brevundimonad (viz. Trivialisation of names).

Survival on Mars
Brevundimonas is one of few bacteria showing high survival rates under simulated Martian conditions. Results from one of these experimental irradiation experiments, combined with previous radiation modeling, indicate that Brevundimonas sp. MV.7 em-placed only 30 cm deep in Martian dust could survive the cosmic radiation for up to 100,000 years before suffering 106 population reduction.

References 

Caulobacterales
Bacteria genera